Yusuke Fujimoto (born July 22, 1975) is a Japanese former heavyweight kickboxer who competed in K-1 and was the K-1 World GP 2007 in Hong Kong tournament champion. He is nicknamed "Bun Bun Maru" because of his tendency to throw big, swinging punches, and is distinguishable by his bald head and lack of eyebrows. He holds notable victories over Musashi, Dewey Cooper, and Francois Botha.

Career
Fujimoto made his professional kickboxing debut at K-1 Rising 2000 on January 25, 2000 and scored a second round TKO victory over Masanobu Yamanaka. He briefly stepped down to amateur status the same year, winning the Monster Challenge 2000 K-2 Tournament via decision over the returning Yamanaka. This was the only championship Fujimoto would win for some time: he entered four regional tournaments within the following three years but was regularly defeated, advancing no further than the last match of the K-1 Survival 2003 Japan Grand Prix Final.

At K-1 Burning 2004, Fujimoto broke his right arm during a match with Montanha Silva. The injury kept him out of competition for 14 months. He returned to fight Carter Williams at the K-1 World Grand Prix 2005 in Las Vegas, but was injured again when Williams broke his nose, ending the match via no contest. Fujimoto later made it to the finals of the K-1 World Grand Prix 2005 in Hawaii but was knocked out by Gary Goodridge.

The following year saw a change in Fujimoto’s fortune. On June 3, he bested ssireum wrestler Dong-wook Kim, karateka Tsuyoshi Nakasako, and Olympic judoka Kim Min-soo to win the K-1 World Grand Prix 2006 in Seoul – becoming the first Japanese K-1 competitor to win an overseas tournament. His victory brought him to the K-1 World Grand Prix 2006 in Osaka Opening Round, where he fought the legendary Ernesto Hoost to a third round KO loss. In March 2007, he entered a tournament to determine the first K-1 Heavyweight Champion and met Musashi in the semifinals at the K-1 World Grand Prix 2007 in Yokohama. In one of the most significant wins of his career, Fujimoto exercised great timing and reach over the two-time WGP runner-up, eventually securing a TKO with a kick to the head. He subsequently met Badr Hari at the finals and suffered a KO loss within the first minute of the opening round.

Later that year, Fujimoto won the K-1 World Grand Prix 2007 in Hong Kong – his second regional tournament. It was a controversial event, with Fujimoto losing his semifinal match to Taiei Kin but nevertheless advancing due to Kin suffering a facial injury. Fujimoto entered his finals match to conspicuous silence from the crowd, but eventually elicited cheers upon defeating sanshou champion Wang Qiang. Fujimoto subsequently reached the WGP Final Elimination for a second time but forfeited to opponent Junichi Sawayashiki following multiple knockdowns.

Fujimoto lost his only 2008 bout to karate champion Ewerton Teixeira after breaking his right arm for a second time. He was out of action for over a year, and declared on his personal blog to be considering withdrawal from kickboxing. These considerations proved concrete, as Fujimoto engaged in his retirement match on November 3, 2009 – defeating Junpei Hamada by unanimous decision at the Japan-Korea International Martial Arts Competition. Over a year later, he fought an additional retirement bout for K-1 so as to bid farewell to the company responsible for his career. On December 10 at the K-1 World Grand Prix 2010 Final, Fujimoto competed against Hesdy Gerges. Over 8 inches (22 cm) shorter than his opponent and considerably less muscular than his norm, he was knocked down three times in the first round and lost via TKO. After the bout, a retirement ceremony commenced wherein Fujimoto received flowers from his family and thanked his authorities and fans. He retired with a record of 27 wins, 17 losses, and 1 no contest.

Personal life
Fujimoto claims that his signature look of a bald head and brows is the result of natural causes, stating he suffered from alopecia areata because of stress involved in his participation in martial arts competitions, and decided to shave his head. He had previously suffered from the condition during high school. His eyebrows began growing back in July 2005.

He is an avid bodybuilder and weightlifter, bench pressing a personal best of 140 kilos (308 pounds).

He has a sister, as well as one niece and one nephew. His favorite food is ayu.

Titles
Professional
2007 K-1 World Grand Prix in Hong Kong champion
2006 K-1 World Grand Prix in Seoul champion
2005 K-1 World Grand Prix in Hawaii runner up
2005 Japan GP 3rd place
2003 K-1 Japan GP runner up
2002 K-1 Japan GP 3rd place
Amateur
Monster Challenge 2000 K-2 Tournament Heavyweight Winner

Kickboxing record

|-  bgcolor="#FFBBBB"
| 2010-12-11 || Loss ||align=left| Hesdy Gerges || K-1 World Grand Prix 2010 Final Super-fight || Ariake, Japan || KO (Right leg kicks) || 1 || 1:41
|-  bgcolor="#CCFFCC"
| 2009-11-03 || Win ||align=left| Junpei Hamada || Japan-Korea International Martial Arts Competition: Gladiator Okayama || Okayama, Japan || Decision (Unanimous) || 3 || 3:00
|-  bgcolor="#FFBBBB"
| 2008-04-13 || Loss ||align=left| Ewerton Teixeira || K-1 World Grand Prix 2008 in Yokohama || Yokohama, Japan || KO (Right cross) || 2 Ext R.(5) || 2:01
|-  bgcolor="#FFBBBB"
| 2007-09-29 || Loss ||align=left| Junichi Sawayashiki || K-1 World GP 2007 Final Elimination　|| Seoul, Korea || KO (gave up/3 knockdowns) || 3 || 1:34
|-  bgcolor="#CCFFCC"
| 2007-08-05 || Win ||align=left| Wang Qiang || K-1 World Grand Prix 2007 in Hong Kong Final || Hong Kong || KO (Left hook) || 1 || 2:49
|-
! style=background:white colspan=9 |
|-
|-  bgcolor="#FFBBBB"
| 2007-08-05 || Loss ||align=left| Taiei Kin || K-1 World Grand Prix 2007 in Hong Kong Semi-final || Hong Kong || KO (Knee attack) || 2 || 1:59
|-
! style=background:white colspan=9 |
|-
|-  bgcolor="#CCFFCC"
| 2007-08-05 || Win ||align=left| Shi Hongjian || K-1 World Grand Prix 2007 in Hong Kong Quarter-final || Hong Kong || Decision (Unanimous) || 3 || 3:00
|-  bgcolor="#FFBBBB"
| 2007-04-28 || Loss ||align=left| Badr Hari || K-1 World Grand Prix 2007 in Hawaii || Honolulu, Hawaii || KO (Left high kick) || 1 || 0:56
|-
! style=background:white colspan=9 |
|-
|-  bgcolor="#CCFFCC"
| 2007-03-04 || Win ||align=left| Musashi || K-1 World Grand Prix 2007 in Yokohama || Yokohama, Japan || KO (Left high kick) || Ex.1(4) || 1:23
|-
! style=background:white colspan=9 |
|-
|-  bgcolor="#FFBBBB"
| 2006-12-16 || Loss ||align=left| Freddy Kemayo || K-1 Fighting Network Prague Round '07 || Prague, Czech Republic || KO || 3 || 2:35
|-  bgcolor="#FFBBBB"
| 2006-09-30 || Loss ||align=left| Ernesto Hoost || K-1 World Grand Prix 2006 in Osaka Opening Round Elimination Fight || Osaka, Japan || KO (Right low kick) || 3 || 2:09
|-  bgcolor="#CCFFCC"
| 2006-07-30 || Win ||align=left| Bobby Ologun || K-1 World Grand Prix 2006 in Sapporo || Sapporo, Japan || Decision (Unanimous) || 3 || 3:00
|-  bgcolor="#CCFFCC"
| 2006-06-03 || Win ||align=left| Min-Soo Kim || K-1 World Grand Prix 2006 in Seoul Final || Seoul, South Korea || KO (Right hook) || 2 || 0:23
|-
! style=background:white colspan=9 |
|-
|-  bgcolor="#CCFFCC"
| 2006-06-03 || Win ||align=left| Tsuyoshi Nakasako || K-1 World Grand Prix 2006 in Seoul Semi-final || Seoul, South Korea || Decision (Majority 2-0) || 3 || 3:00
|-  bgcolor="#CCFFCC"
| 2006-06-03 || Win ||align=left| Dong-Wook Kim || K-1 World Grand Prix 2006 in Seoul Quarter-final || Seoul, South Korea || Decision (Unanimous) || 3 || 3:00
|-  bgcolor="#FFBBBB"
| 2006-04-29 || Loss ||align=left| Carter Williams || K-1 World Grand Prix 2006 in Las Vegas || Las Vegas, Nevada || Decision (Unanimous) || 3 || 3:00
|-  bgcolor="#FFBBBB"
| 2005-07-29 || Loss ||align=left| Gary Goodridge || K-1 World Grand Prix 2005 in Hawaii Final ||  Honolulu, Hawaii || KO (Left hook) || 3 || 1:19
|-
! style=background:white colspan=9 |
|-
|-  bgcolor="#CCFFCC"
| 2005-07-29 || Win ||align=left| Marcus Royster || K-1 World Grand Prix 2005 in Hawaii Semi final ||  Honolulu, Hawaii || KO (Left hook) || 1 || 2:16
|-  bgcolor="#CCFFCC"
| 2005-07-29 || Win ||align=left| Scott Junk || K-1 World Grand Prix 2005 in Hawaii Quarter final || Honolulu, Hawaii || KO (Right hook) || 3 || 2:21
|-  bgcolor="#FFBBBB"
| 2005-06-14 || Loss ||align=left| Tatsufumi Tomihira || K-1 World Grand Prix 2005 in Hiroshima Semi-final || Hiroshima, Japan || KO (Right high kick) || 1 || 2:39
|-  bgcolor="#CCFFCC"
| 2005-06-14 || Win ||align=left| Ryu Moriguchi || K-1 World Grand Prix 2005 in Hiroshima Quarter-final || Hiroshima, Japan || Decision (Unanimous) || 3 || 3:00
|-  bgcolor="#c5d2ea"
| 2005-04-30 || NC ||align=left| Carter Williams || K-1 World Grand Prix 2005 in Las Vegas Quarter-final || Las Vegas, Nevada || No contest || 1 || ?
|-
! style=background:white colspan=9 |
|-
|-  bgcolor="#FFBBBB"
| 2004-02-15 || Loss ||align=left| Montanha Silva || K-1 Burning 2004 || Ginowan, Japan || KO (Right cross) || 3 || 1:04
|-  bgcolor="#CCFFCC"
| 2003-12-31 || Win ||align=left| Francois Botha || K-1 PREMIUM 2003 Dynamite!! || Nagoya, Japan || Decision (Unanimous) || 3 || 3:00
|-  bgcolor="#CCFFCC"
| 2003-12-06 || Win ||align=left| Matthias Riccio || K-1 World Grand Prix 2003 Final Opening-fight || Tokyo, Japan || KO (Left hook) || 2 || 2:34
|-  bgcolor="#FFBBBB"
| 2003-09-21 || Loss ||align=left| Musashi || K-1 Survival 2003 Japan Grand Prix Final Final || Yokohama, Japan || Decision (Majority 0-2) || Ex 1(4) || 3:00
|-  bgcolor="#CCFFCC"
| 2003-09-21 || Win ||align=left| Hiromi Amada || K-1 Survival 2003 Japan Grand Prix Final Semi-final || Yokohama, Japan || Decision (Unanimous) || 3 || 3:00
|-  bgcolor="#CCFFCC"
| 2003-09-21 || Win ||align=left| Nobu Hayashi || K-1 Survival 2003 Japan Grand Prix Final Quarter-final || Yokohama, Japan || Decision (Split 2-1) || Ex 1(4) || 3:00
|-  bgcolor="#FFBBBB"
| 2003-09-21 || Loss ||align=left| Eric Esch || K-1 Beast II 2003 || Saitama, Japan || KO (Left hook) || 1 || 1:02
|-  bgcolor="#FFBBBB"
| 2003-06-29 || Loss ||align=left| Carter Williams || K-1 World Grand Prix 2003 in Las Vegas Semi-final || Las Vegas, Nevada || TKO (Right hook/2 knockdowns) || 2 || 2:26
|-  bgcolor="#CCFFCC"
| 2003-05-03 || Win ||align=left| Dewey Cooper || K-1 World Grand Prix 2003 in Las Vegas Quarter-final || Las Vegas, Nevada || Decision (Majority 2-0) || 3 || 3:00
|-  bgcolor="#CCFFCC"
| 2003-04-06 || Win ||align=left| Kerri Karena || K-1 Beast 2003 || Yamagata, Japan || KO (Right cross) || 3 || 1:20
|-  bgcolor="#FFBBBB"
| 2002-09-22 || Loss ||align=left| Tsuyoshi Nakasako || K-1 Andy Spirits Japan GP 2002 Final Semi-final || Osaka, Japan || KO (Left hook) || 2 || 2:18
|-  bgcolor="#CCFFCC"
| 2002-09-22 || Win ||align=left| Toru Oishi || K-1 Andy Spirits Japan GP 2002 Final Quarter-final || Osaka, Japan || KO (Left high kick) || 3 || 1:47
|-  bgcolor="#FFBBBB"
| 2002-08-10 || Loss ||align=left| Rony Sefo || Ichigeki || Urayasu, Japan || KO (Right uppercut/3 knockdowns) || 1 || 2:51
|-  bgcolor="#CCFFCC"
| 2002-07-14 || Win ||align=left| Ryo Takigawa || K-1 World Grand Prix 2002 in Fukuoka || Fukuoka, Japan || KO(Left cross) || 1 || 3:00
|-  bgcolor="#CCFFCC"
| 2002-01-27 || Win ||align=left| Cedric Kongaika || K-1 Rising 2002 || Shizuoka, Japan || Decision(Unanimous) || 5 || 3:00
|-  bgcolor="#FFBBBB"
| 2001-08-19 || Loss ||align=left| Nicholas Pettas || K-1 Andy Memorial 2001 Japan GP Final Quarter-final || Saitama, Japan || KO(Right low kick) || 1 || 2:57
|-  bgcolor="#CCFFCC"
| 2001-06-24 || Win ||align=left| Noboru Uchida || K-1 Survival 2001 || Sendai, Japan || KO || Ex 1R(4) || 1:15
|-  bgcolor="#CCFFCC"
| 2001-04-15 || Win ||align=left| Yasuhiro Anbe  || K-1 Burning 2001 || Kumamoto, Japan || Decision(Unanimous) || 3 || 3:00
|-  bgcolor="#FFBBBB"
| 2000-11-19 || Loss ||align=left| Ricky Nickolson || K-1 UK Global Heat 2000 || Birmingham, England || KO (Right hook) || 2 || 0:33
|-  bgcolor="#CCFFCC"
| 2000-10-09 || Win ||align=left| Shinji Yoda || K-1 World Grand Prix 2000 in Fukuoka || Fukuoka, Japan || KO (Right low kick) || 2 || 2:54
|-  bgcolor="#CCFFCC"
| 2000-07-07 || Win ||align=left| Issei Nakai || K-1 Spirits 2000 || Sendai, Japan || Decision (Unanimous) || 3 || 3:00
|-  bgcolor="#CCFFCC"
| 2000-03-19 || Win ||align=left| Ryo Takigawa || K-1 Burning 2000 || Yokohama, Japan || KO (Right cross/3 knockdowns) || 2 || 1:10
|-  bgcolor="#CCFFCC"
| 2000-01-25 || Win ||align=left| Masanobu Yamanaka || K-1 Rising 2000 Pro debut fight || Nagasaki, Japan || TKO || 2 || 0:36
|-

|-  bgcolor="#CCFFCC"
| 2000-09-03 || Win ||align=left| Masanobu Yamanaka || Monster Challenge 2000 Japan Open "The Road to K-1" K-2 Tournament Heavyweight Final || Tokyo, Japan || Decision (4-0) || 1 || 3:00
|-
! style=background:white colspan=9 |
|-
|-  bgcolor="#CCFFCC"
| 2000-09-03 || Win ||align=left| Tatsunori Momose || Monster Challenge 2000 Japan Open "The Road to K-1" K-2 Tournament Heavyweight Semi-final || Tokyo, Japan || KO (Left middle kick) ||  || 
|-
| colspan=9 | Legend:

See also 
List of male kickboxers
List of K-1 Events

References

External links
Official K-1 website
Yusuke Fujimoto K-1 profile

1975 births
Living people
Japanese male kickboxers
Heavyweight kickboxers
Japanese male karateka
Sportspeople from Kyoto